Orta Salahlı may refer to:
Orta Salahlı, Agstafa, Azerbaijan
Orta Salahlı, Qazakh, Azerbaijan